Apoapsis Records is an independent boutique record label based in London UK, founded by brothers Vasileios Angelis and Apostolos Angelis in 2009, in order to release their own music. The label started in Greece and later on moved to London UK. Apoapsis Records focuses mainly on Electronic music in the genres of Orchestral, Classical, Ethnic and Electronica and has released over 100 original recordings.

Apoapsis Records was one of the first labels worldwide that joined and supported the DR movement (Pleasurize Music non-profit Organization for more dynamic range in produced music) for an end of the Loudness war.

Discography 
 Apostolos Angelis - Hologram (APRDT01/APRCD01, 2009)
 Vasilis Angelis - Amalgama (APRDT02/APRCD02, 2010)
 Apostolos Angelis - Prophecy Of Heavens (APRDT03, 2012)
 Vasilis Angelis - Memoria De Profundis (APRDT04, 2013)
 Apostolos Angelis - The Mad And The Genius (APRDT05, 2013)
 Apostolos Angelis - Kinesis (APRDT06, 2014)
 Vasilis Angelis - Seven (APRDT07, 2016)
 Apostolos Angelis - Coloring Of Life (APRDT08, 2017)
 Apostolos Angelis - Mythocosmos (APRDT09, 2022)
 Vasilis Angelis - Chronomorph (APRDT10, 2022)

Name and Logo Origin 
The idea for the name and logo comes from the astronomical term Apoapsis: An apsis (Greek apsis) is the point of greatest or least distance of a body from one of the foci of its elliptical orbit. The point of farthest excursion is called the Apoapsis (Greek apó, “from”). It’s actually the point in an orbit farthest from the body being orbited.

References

External links 
 Official website

Record labels based in London
British companies established in 2009
Record labels established in 2009